Lower City (Portuguese: Cidade Baixa) is a 2005 film by Brazilian director Sérgio Machado.

Lower City may also refer to:

 Lower City, Connecticut, an unincorporated community in Litchfield County, Connecticut
 The lower city or lower town of various town, notably Carcassonne, calquing French ville basse or basse-ville
 Lower City Mills, Perth, Scotland

See also
Cidade Baixa (disambiguation)